The European Trampoline Championships is the main trampoline gymnastics championships in Europe, organized by the European Union of Gymnastics.

Championships 
Seniors from 1969, Juniors from 1972, Seniors and Juniors at the same time from 2000.

Medal table
 Last updated after the 2022 European Trampoline Championships

See also
 Trampoline Gymnastics World Championships
 Junior_World_Gymnastics_Championships#Trampoline
 Asian_Gymnastics_Championships#Trampoline
 Pan_American_Gymnastics_Championships#Trampoline_and_tumbling
 South_American_Gymnastics_Championships#Trampoline_and_tumbling

Results
 Full Results
 https://www.the-sports.org/gymnastics-european-trampoline-championships-2022-medals-epa120866.html
 https://www.the-sports.org/gymnastics-european-trampoline-championships-2021-medals-epa113260.html
 https://www.the-sports.org/gymnastics-european-junior-trampoline-championships-results-2022-men-epm122558.html
 https://www.the-sports.org/gymnastics-european-junior-trampoline-championships-results-2022-women-epf122558.html

References
Hosts

External links
International Federation of Gymnastics

 
European championships
Recurring sporting events established in 1969
Trampoline competitions